Peter Robert Hadfield  (born 21 January 1955) is an Australian Olympic athlete who competed in the decathlon.

Hadfield won a total of nine Australian Championships in Athletics between 1976 and 1985. He didn't compete in the National Championships in 1978 as he was living in Paris at the time, training there for the Edmonton Commonwealth Games. He was the best decathlete in Australia for ten years from his first nationals win in 1976, when he broke the Australian record, until he retired after the National Championships in 1985. Although he was the National Champion and record holder for the decathlon he was not selected to compete in the Montreal Olympics that year. He competed at the two following Olympic Games in Moscow (1980), (finishing 4th behind Thompson) and Los Angeles (1984) and two Commonwealth Games in Edmonton (1978) and Brisbane (1982), winning the silver medal, behind Daley Thompson in the 1978 Commonwealth Games in Edmonton.

Statistics

Personal Bests

See also
 Australian athletics champions

References

External links
sports-reference

1955 births
Living people
Australian decathletes
Athletes (track and field) at the 1978 Commonwealth Games
Athletes (track and field) at the 1980 Summer Olympics
Athletes (track and field) at the 1982 Commonwealth Games
Athletes (track and field) at the 1984 Summer Olympics
Olympic athletes of Australia
Commonwealth Games silver medallists for Australia
Commonwealth Games medallists in athletics
Medallists at the 1978 Commonwealth Games